James Earl or James Earle may refer to:

 James Earl (1761–1796), American painter
 Jim Earl, American cartoonist and comedian
 Jimmy Earl (born 1957), American jazz musician
 James Earle (1755–1817), British surgeon
 James Earl, American actor in Glory Daze

See also
 
 
 Earl (surname)
 Earle (surname)